The 1948 Dartmouth Indians football team was an American football team that represented Dartmouth College as an independent during the 1948 college football season. In their sixth season under head coach Tuss McLaughry, the Indians compiled a 6–2 record, and outscored their opponents 213 to 130. Dale Armstrong was the team captain.

Dartmouth played its home games at Memorial Field on the college campus in Hanover, New Hampshire.

Schedule

References

Dartmouth
Dartmouth Big Green football seasons
Dartmouth Indians football